The Pick-up Artist may refer to:
The Pick-up Artist (1987 film), an American film starring Molly Ringwald and Robert Downey Jr.
The Pickup Artist (2019 film), an Indian film 
The Pickup Artist (TV series), a VH1 reality series

See also:
Pickup artist